The subfamily Alcelaphinae or tribe Alcelaphini of the family Bovidae contains wildebeest, hartebeest, bonteboks, and several similar species. Depending on the classification, there are 6–10 species placed in four genera, although Beatragus is sometimes considered a subgenus of Damaliscus, and Sigmoceros for the Lichtenstein's hartebeest.

Subfamily Alcelaphinae
 Genus Beatragus
 Hirola, Beatragus hunteri
 Genus Damaliscus
 Tsessebe, D. lunatus
 Korrigum, D. lunatus korrigum
 Topi, D. lunatus jimela
 Coastal topi, D. lunatus topi
 Bontebok, D. pygargus
 Bontebok (subspecies), D. p. pygargus
 Blesbok, D. p. phillipsi
 Genus Alcelaphus
 Hartebeest, A. buselaphus
 Bubal hartebeest, †A. b. buselaphus
 Coke's hartebeest, A. b. cokii
 Lelwel hartebeest, A. b. lelwel
 Western hartebeest, A. b. major
 Swayne's hartebeest, A. b. swaynei
 Tora hartebeest, A. b. tora
 Red hartebeest, A. b. caama
 Lichtenstein's hartebeest, A. b. lichtensteinii
 Genus Connochaetes
 Black wildebeest, C. gnou
 Blue wildebeest, C. taurinus
 Blue wildebeest C. t. taurinus
 Eastern white-bearded wildebeest C. t. albojubatus
 Cookson's wildebeest C. t. cooksoni
 Nyassaland wildebeest C. t. johnstoni
 Western white-bearded wildebeest C. t. mearnsi

Extinct alcelaphines

 Subfamily Alcelaphini
 Beatragus
 †Beatragus antiquus
 Connochaetes
 †Connochaetes africanus
 †Connochaetes gentryi
 Connochaetes gnou
 †Connochaetes gnou laticornutus
 †Connochaetes gnou antiquus
 Connochaetes taurinus
 †Connochaetes taurinus olduvaiensis
 Damaliscus
 †Damaliscus hypsodon
 †Damaliscus niro
 †Damalacra
 †Damalacra acalla †Damalops †Damalops palaeindicus †Megalotragus †Megalotragus kattwinkeli †Megalotragus priscus †Numidocapra †Numidocapra arambourgi †Numidocapra crassicornis †Numidocapra porrocornutus †Oreonagor †Oreonagor tournoueri †Parestigorgon †Parmularius †Parmularius pachyceras †Parmularius ambiquus †Parmularius pandatus †Parmularius atlanticus †Parmularius rugosus †Parmularius altidens †Parmularius angusticornis †Rabaticeras †Rabaticeras lemutai †Rhynotragus †Rusingoryx''

References

 
Bovidae
Mammal tribes
 
Extant Miocene first appearances
Taxa named by Victor Brooke